Pierre Smith (born 1 September 1990) is a Bermudian cricketer. He was part of Bermuda's squad for the 2008 Under-19 Cricket World Cup. In November 2019, he was named in Bermuda's squad for the Cricket World Cup Challenge League B tournament in Oman. He made his List A debut, for Bermuda against Jersey, on 11 December 2019.

References

External links
 

1990 births
Living people
Bermudian cricketers
Place of birth missing (living people)